Cortana is a virtual assistant developed by Microsoft that uses the Bing search engine to perform tasks such as setting reminders and answering questions for the user.

Cortana is currently available in English, Portuguese, French, German, Italian, Spanish, Chinese, and Japanese language editions, depending on the software platform and region in which it is used.

Microsoft began reducing the prevalence of Cortana and converting it from an assistant into different software integrations in 2019. It was split from the Windows 10 search bar in April 2019. In January 2020, the Cortana mobile app was removed from certain markets, and on March 31, 2021, the Cortana mobile app was shut down globally.

History 
Cortana was demonstrated for the first time at the Microsoft Build developer conference in San Francisco in April 2014. It was launched as a key ingredient of Microsoft's planned "makeover" of future operating systems for Windows Phone and Windows.

It is named after Cortana, a synthetic intelligence character in Microsoft's Halo video game franchise originating in Bungie folklore, with Jen Taylor, the character's voice actress, returning to voice the personal assistant's US-specific version.

Development 
The development of Cortana started in 2009 in the Microsoft Speech products team with general manager Zig Serafin and Chief Scientist Larry Heck. Heck and Serafin established the vision, mission, and long-range plan for Microsoft's digital personal assistant and they built a team with the expertise to create the initial prototypes for Cortana. Some of the key researchers in these early efforts included Microsoft Research researchers Dilek Hakkani-Tür, Gokhan Tur, Andreas Stolcke, and Malcolm Slaney, research software developer Madhu Chinthakunta, and user experience designer Lisa Stifelman. To develop the Cortana digital assistant, the team interviewed human personal assistants. The interviews inspired a number of unique features in Cortana, including the assistant's "notebook" feature. Originally, Cortana was meant to be only a codename, but a petition on Windows Phone's UserVoice site proved to be popular and made the codename official.

Expansion to other platforms 

In January 2015, Microsoft announced the availability of Cortana for Windows 10 desktops and mobile devices as part of merging Windows Phone into the operating system at large.

On May 26, 2015, Microsoft announced that Cortana would also be available on other mobile platforms. An Android release was set for July 2015, but the Android APK file containing Cortana was leaked ahead of its release. It was officially released, along with an iOS version, in December 2015.

During E3 2015, Microsoft announced that Cortana would come to the Xbox One as part of a universally designed Windows 10 update for the console.

New focus 
In 2017, Microsoft partnered with Amazon to integrate Echo and Cortana with each other, allowing users of each smart assistant to summon the other via a command. This feature preview was released in August 2018. Windows 10 users can just say "Hey Cortana, open Alexa" and Echo users can say "Alexa, open Cortana" to summon the other assistant. 

In January 2019, Microsoft CEO Satya Nadella stated that he no longer sees Cortana as a direct competitor against Alexa and Siri.

Decreasing focus on Cortana 
On July 24, 2020, Cortana was removed from the Xbox dashboard as part of a redesign, then on January 31, 2021, Microsoft removed the Cortana mobile application in certain markets (including UK, Australia, Germany, Mexico, China, Spain, Canada, and India).

On March 31, 2021, Microsoft shut down the Cortana apps entirely for iOS and Android and removed them from corresponding app stores. To access previously recorded content, users have to use Cortana on Windows 10 or another specialized Microsoft application.

Microsoft has also reduced emphasis on Cortana in Windows 11. Cortana is not used during the new device setup process and isn't pinned to the taskbar by default.

Cortana in other services 

Microsoft has integrated Cortana into numerous products such as Microsoft Edge, the browser bundled with Windows 10. Microsoft's Cortana assistant is deeply integrated into its Edge browser. Cortana can find opening hours when on restaurant sites, show retail coupons for websites, or show weather information in the address bar. At the Worldwide Partners Conference 2015 Microsoft demonstrated Cortana integration with products such as GigJam. Conversely, Microsoft announced in late April 2016 that it would block anything other than Bing and Edge from being used to complete Cortana searches, again raising questions of anti-competitive practices by the company.

Microsoft's "Windows in the car" concept includes Cortana. The concept makes it possible for drivers to make restaurant reservations and see places before they go there.

At Microsoft Build 2016, Microsoft announced plans to integrate Cortana into Skype (Microsoft's video-conferencing and instant messaging service) as a bot to allow users to order food, book trips, transcribe video messages and make calendar appointments through Cortana in addition to other bots. , Cortana can underline certain words and phrases in Skype conversations that relate to contacts and corporations. A writer from Engadget has criticised the Cortana integration in Skype for responding only to very specific keywords, feeling as if she was "chatting with a search engine" due to the impersonal way the bots replied to certain words such as "Hello" causing the Bing Music bot to bring up Adele's song of that name.

Microsoft also announced at Microsoft Build 2016 that Cortana would be able to cloud-synchronise notifications between Windows 10 Mobile's and Windows 10's Action Center, as well as notifications from Android devices.

In December 2016, Microsoft announced the preview of Calendar.help, a service that enabled people to delegate the scheduling of meetings to Cortana. Users interact with Cortana by including her in email conversations. Cortana would then check people's availability in Outlook Calendar or Google Calendar, and work with others Cc'd on the email to schedule the meeting. The service relied on automation and human-based computation.

In May 2017, Microsoft in collaboration with Harman Kardon announced INVOKE, a voice-activated speaker featuring Cortana. The premium speaker has a cylindrical design and offers 360 degree sound, the ability to make and receive calls with Skype, and all of the other features currently available with Cortana.

Functionality 
Cortana can set reminders, recognize natural voice without the requirement for keyboard input, and answer questions using information from the Bing search engine (For example, current weather and traffic conditions, sports scores, biographies). Searches using Windows 10 are made only with the Microsoft Bing search engine, and all links will open with Microsoft Edge, except when a screen reader such as Narrator is being used, where the links will open in Internet Explorer. Windows Phone 8.1's universal Bing SmartSearch features are incorporated into Cortana, which replaces the previous Bing Search app, which was activated when a user presses the "Search" button on their device. Cortana includes a music recognition service. Cortana can simulate rolling dice and flipping a coin. Cortana's "Concert Watch" monitors Bing searches to determine the bands or musicians that interest the user. It integrates with the Microsoft Band watch band for Windows Phone devices if connected via Bluetooth, it can make reminders and phone notifications.

Since the Lumia Denim mobile phone series, launched in October 2014, active listening was added to Cortana enabling it to be invoked with the phrase: "Hey Cortana". It can then be controlled as usual. Some devices from the United Kingdom by O2 received the Lumia Denim update without the feature, but this was later clarified as a bug and Microsoft has since fixed it.

Cortana integrates with services such as Foursquare to provide restaurant and local attraction recommendations and LIFX to control smart light bulbs.

Notebook 
Cortana stores personal information such as interests, location data, reminders, and contacts in the "Notebook". It can draw upon and add to this data to learn a user's specific patterns and behaviors. Users can view and specify what information is collected to allow some control over privacy, said to be "a level of control that goes beyond comparable assistants". Users can delete information from the "Notebook".

Reminders 

Cortana has a built-in system of reminders, which can, for example, be associated with a specific contact; it will then remind the user when in communication with that contact, possibly at a specific time or when the phone is in a specific location. Originally, these reminders were specific to the device Cortana was installed on but starting on February 12, 2015, Cortana synchronizes reminders across devices.

Design 

Most versions of Cortana take the form of two nested circles, which are animated to indicate activities such as searching or talking. The main color scheme includes a black or white background and shades of blue for the respective circles.

Phone notification syncing 
Cortana on Windows mobile and Android is capable of capturing device notifications and sending them to a Windows 10 device. This allows a computer user to view notifications from their phone in the Windows 10 Action Center. The feature was announced in early 2016 and released later in the year.

Miscellaneous 
Cortana has a "do-not-disturb" mode in which users can specify "quiet hours", as was available for Windows Phone 8.1 users. Users can change the settings so that Cortana calls users by their names or nicknames. It also has a library of "Easter Eggs", pre-determined remarks.

When asked for a prediction, Cortana correctly predicted the winners of the first 14 matches of the football 2014 FIFA World Cup knockout stage, including the semi-finals, before it incorrectly picked Brazil over the Netherlands in the third place play-off match; this streak topped Paul the Octopus who correctly predicted all 7 of Germany's 2010 FIFA World Cup matches as well as the Final. Cortana can forecast results in various other sports such as the NBA, the NFL, the Super Bowl, the ICC Cricket World Cup and various European football leagues. Cortana can solve mathematical equations, convert units of measurement, and determine the exchange rates between currencies including Bitcoin.

Integrations 
Cortana can integrate with third-party apps on Windows 10 or directly through the service. Starting in late 2016, Cortana integrated with Microsoft's Wunderlist service, allowing Cortana to add and act on reminders.

At Microsoft's Build 2017 conference, Microsoft announced that Cortana would get a consumer third-party skills capability, similar to that in Amazon Alexa.

On February 16, 2018, Microsoft announced connected home skills were added for ecobee, Honeywell Lyric, Honeywell Total Connect Comfort, LIFX, TP-Link Kasa, and Geeni, as well as support for IFTTT. At Microsoft's Ignite 2018 conference, Microsoft announced an Technology Adopters Program that Enterprises could build skills that could be developed and deployed into Azure tenants, accessible by organizational units or security groups.

Privacy concerns 
Cortana indexes and stores user information. Cortana can be disabled; this will cause Windows search to search Bing as well as the local computer, but that can also be disabled. Turning Cortana off does not in itself delete user data stored on Microsoft's servers, but it can be deleted by user action. Microsoft has further been criticized for requests to Bing's website for a file called "threshold.appcache", which contains Cortana's information through searches made through the Start Menu even when Cortana is disabled on Windows 10.

, Cortana was disabled for users aged under 13 years.

Regions and languages 

The British version of Cortana speaks with a British accent and uses British idioms, while the Chinese version, known as Xiao Na, speaks Mandarin Chinese and has an icon featuring a face and two eyes, which is not used in other regions.

 the English version of Cortana on Windows devices is available to all users in the United States (American English), Canada (French/English), Australia, India, and the United Kingdom (British English). Other language versions of Cortana are available in France (French), China (Simplified Chinese), Japan (Japanese), Germany (German), Italy (Italian), Brazil (Portuguese), Mexico, and Spain (Spanish). Cortana listens generally to the hot word "Hey Cortana" in addition to certain languages' customized versions, such as "Hola Cortana" in Spanish.

The English United Kingdom localised version of Cortana is voiced by voice actress Ginnie Watson, while the United States localised version is voiced by Jen Taylor. Taylor is the voice actress who voices Cortana, the namesake of the virtual assistant, in the Halo video game series.

The following table identifies the localized version of Cortana currently available. Except where indicated, this applies to both Windows Mobile and Windows 10 versions of the assistant.

Technology 
The natural language processing capabilities of Cortana are derived from Tellme Networks (bought by Microsoft in 2007) and are coupled with a Semantic search database called Satori.

While many of Cortana's U.S. English responses are voiced by Jen Taylor, organic responses require the use of a text-to-speech engine. Microsoft Eva is the name of the text-to-speech voice for organic response in Cortana's U.S. English.

Updating 
Cortana updates were delivered independently of those to the main Windows Phone OS, allowing Microsoft to provide new features at a faster pace. Not all Cortana-related features could be updated in this manner, as some features such as "Hey Cortana" required the Windows Phone update service and the Qualcomm Snapdragon SensorCore Technology.

See also
 List of speech recognition software

References

External links 
 Cortana Compatible Devices
 Cortana Supported Languages
 Cortana for Developers
 "Microsoft's virtual assistant, Cortana"—The New York Times
 Cortana Analytics Suite Overview
 Dale, Jason (June 26, 2019). "How to  Quickly Disable Cortana in Windows 10". Hows.tech. Covers steps to turn off Cortana on Windows 10.

2014 software
Android (operating system) software
IOS software
Natural language processing software
Virtual assistants
Windows 10
Windows components
Windows Phone software
Windows Phone